Gentlewoman is a courtesy name and social rank.

Gentlewoman or variant, may also refer to:

 A Gentle Woman (film), a 1969 French film
 The Gentlewoman (periodical), a weekly newspaper founded in London in 1890
 The Gentlewoman (magazine), a biannual magazine founded in 2010

See also

 Chief Gentlewoman of the Privy Chamber
 Gentlewoman of the Privy Chamber, see Lady of the Bedchamber
 Gentlelady
 
 
 
 
 Gent (disambiguation)
 Lady (disambiguation)
 Woman (disambiguation)
 Women (disambiguation)
 Gentle (disambiguation)
 Gentleman (disambiguation)